The 1909 Hawick Burghs by-election was held on 5 March 1909.  The by-election was held due to the resignation  of the incumbent Liberal MP, Thomas Shaw.  It was won by the Liberal candidate John Barran.

Result

References

Hawick Burghs by-election
1900s elections in Scotland
Hawick
Politics of the Scottish Borders
Hawick Burghs by-election
Hawick Burghs by-election
By-elections to the Parliament of the United Kingdom in Scottish constituencies